GCH Roundtown Mercedes of Maryscot (2 April 2005 - ), also known as Sadie, was a Scottish terrier from Mackinac Island in the U.S. state of Michigan.

Biography
Sadie was named the 2010 Best In Show winner at the Westminster Kennel Club Dog Show.

Roundtown Mercedes of Maryscot's Best in Show victory at Westminster in February 2010 made Sadie the dog world's first Triple Crown winner: she also won the National Dog Show in November 2009 and the AKC National Championship in December 2009.

Sadie's owners were Amelia and Dan Musser, and her handlers were Gabriel and Ivonne Rangel. Sadie's father and littermates were all named after cars.

Sadie died on 13 August 2014, at the home of her handlers in Rialto, California, following complications from surgery.

See also 
 List of Best in Show winners of the Westminster Kennel Club Dog Show

References

External links

2005 animal births
2014 animal deaths
Best in Show winners of the Westminster Kennel Club Dog Show